The Centre for Research on Energy and Clean Air (CREA) is a nonprofit think tank researching energy and air pollution. CREA was founded in Helsinki in 2019 with the goal of tracking the impacts of air pollution by providing data-backed research products.

References

Think tanks
Air pollution
Coal in China
Coal in India